Schüpbach is a surname. Notable people with the surname include:
 
Gertrud Schüpbach (born 1950), Swiss-American molecular biologist 
Hannes Schüpbach  (born 1965), Swiss artist